Marc Romersa (born 1 February 1956) is a Luxembourgian athlete. He competed in the men's high jump at the 1976 Summer Olympics.

References

1956 births
Living people
Athletes (track and field) at the 1976 Summer Olympics
Luxembourgian male high jumpers
Olympic athletes of Luxembourg
Place of birth missing (living people)